Drum Taps is a 1933 American pre-Code Western film directed and co-written by J.P. McGowan. It stars Ken Maynard and his brother Kermit Maynard playing brothers.

Plot summary
The Skinner Cattle Company is scheming to take over the valley by running ranchers off their homesteads.  Their main opposition comes from Ken Cartwright who they attempt to frame by making it look like Ken rustled cattle.  Ken escapes, but faced with the problem of the Skinner's outlaws using Rocky Pass as a fortress he enlists the aid of Los Angeles Boy Scout Troop #107.

Cast
Ken Maynard as Ken Cartwright
Tarzan as Ken's Horse
Dorothy Dix as Eileen Carey
Frank Coghlan Jr. as Eric Cartwright
Charles Stevens as Indian Joe
Al Bridge as Lariat Smith
Harry Semels as Henchman Pete
Jim Mason as Henchman Stubby Lane
Slim Whitaker as Henchman Hank
Kermit Maynard as Scoutmaster Earl Cartwright
Hooper Atchley as Bradley Skinner
Lloyd Ingraham as Bill Carey, Eileen Carey's Grandfather

External links

1933 films
American Western (genre) films
American black-and-white films
1933 Western (genre) films
Films directed by J. P. McGowan
Films produced by Samuel Bischoff
Films about the Boy Scouts of America
1930s English-language films
1930s American films